James Archibald Campbell (January 13, 1862 – March 18, 1934) founded Campbell University (originally Buies Creek Academy) in Buies Creek, North Carolina in 1887.

Biography
Campbell was the father of Dr. Leslie Campbell, who would succeed him as president of Campbell College and Arthur Carlyle Campbell, who would become president of Meredith College in Raleigh, North Carolina.  Although he first attended in 1886, J.A. Campbell received his Bachelor of Arts degree from Wake Forest College in 1911 on the same day as did his two sons.  One of his grandchildren, Catherine Campbell King, resides across from the university he founded. He is buried at the Buies Creek Cemetery in Buies Creek.

Legacy
The James Archibald Campbell House was listed on the National Register of Historic Places in 1977.

References

1862 births
1934 deaths
Presidents of Campbell University
Wake Forest University alumni
University and college founders
People from Buies Creek, North Carolina